Harvey Randall Wickes Memorial Stadium, known simply as Wickes Stadium, is a 6,800-seat football stadium located in Kochville, Michigan and is a part of the Ryder Center sports complex on the Saginaw Valley State University campus.  It is home to the Saginaw State Valley Cardinals football team.  The Cardinals compete at the NCAA Division II level as a member of the Great Lakes Intercollegiate Athletic Conference.

Wickes Stadium can also be used for other events, including high school football, graduation ceremonies, and soccer.  It is named for Harvey R. Wickes, one of the founders of SVSU.

Renovation
Wickes Stadium underwent a major renovation in the summer of 2011.  The university added a brand new lighting system which allowed the Cardinals to play their first night game in the program's history.  A new video board was also added alongside a state-of-the-art Desso GrassMaster field surface.  Saginaw Valley State is one of only four universities in the NCAA to use this synthetic field turf.

References

External links
Ryder Center webpage
SVSU athletics page

Saginaw Valley State University
Sports venues in Michigan
College football venues
American football venues in Michigan
High school football venues in the United States